Diana Gould may refer to:

Diana Gould (dancer) (1912–2003), British ballerina and occasional actress and singer
Diana Gould (teacher) (1926–2011), British teacher known for an exchange with Margaret Thatcher in 1983
Diana Gould (writer) (born 1944), screenwriter for television and short story author